Gudgeri  is a village in the Kundgol taluk of Dharwad district in the Indian state of Karnataka.
 It is located in the Kundgol taluk of Dharwad district in Karnataka.

Village information
Gudgeri is well known by N Basavaraj(natak company) 
and 
Famous Dyamavva Devi temple is well known here across Karnataka most of devotees will visit here During Navaratri the beautiful Fair celebrated every year here

Gudgeri has train connectivity to Bangalore and Hubli. Bangalore-Hubli-Vasco-Mumbai railway line is laid via this village. The village has road connectivity to Hubli, Lakshmeshwar, Savanur, Shiggaon and Haveri.

The village also has government primary health centre (PHC), government degree college, government PU college, government high school and primary school facilities.
SHNJ high school and Adarsha primary schools are leading education hub here
Harjageri and Ogyo Keri are well known lakes of Gudgeri.
It has an HESCOM 33-KV Power Grid Station At Goudageri road in Gudageri.

Demographics
As of the 2011 Census of India there were 2,183 households in Gudgeri and a total population of 9,886 consisting of 4,996 males and 4,890 females. There were 1,036 children ages 0-6.

See also
Shishuvinahala
Lakshmeshwar
Savanur
Kundgol
Dharwad
Karnataka

References

External links
 http://Dharwad.nic.in/

Villages in Dharwad district